Partners Life is a New Zealand-based insurance company which provides life and health insurance.  it had an annual revenue of $247.5 million NZD. On August 12, 2022, global life insurance specialist Dai-ichi Life Holdings, Inc announced its acquisition of 100% of the shares in Partners Group Holdings Limited, the parent company of Partners Life Limited, subject to regulators approval.

History
Partners Life began as a small start-up in 2011. The venture was supported by reinsurer SCOR.

In 2020, the company announced the purchase of BNZ Life, the life insurance subsidiary of the Bank of New Zealand.  The purchase is subject to approval by the RBNZ.

To celebrate a decade in business, Partners Life launched a rebranding in October 2021 as reported by Goodreturns.

Recognition
In 2012, Partners Life was awarded Best Emerging Business and Excellence in Strategy and Planning at the Westpac Auckland North Business Awards.

In 2018, the company received the Rainbow Tick certification for its LGBTI inclusive culture.

See also
 Financial Markets Authority

References

External links
 

Insurance companies of New Zealand
Companies based in Auckland